The Zee Cine Award Best Lyricist is chosen by the jury and the winner is announced at the actual ceremony.

The award is given in the current year but the winner is awarded for his/her work in the previous year.

The winners are listed below:-

See also
 Zee Cine Awards
 Bollywood
 Cinema of India

Zee Cine Awards